Hrod or Gord (archaeology) is a version of the Slavic word meaning town, city or castle, and is preserved in the toponymy of numerous Slavic countries:
 Hrodna

Slavic toponyms